Heunghae is a town, or eup in Buk-gu, Pohang, North Gyeongsang Province, South Korea. The township Uichang-myeon was upgraded to the town Uichang-eup in 1980, and it was renamed Heunghae-eup in 1983. Heunghae Town Office is located in Okseong-ri.

Communities
Heunghae-eup is divided into 30 villages (ri).

References

External links
Official website 

Pohang
Towns and townships in North Gyeongsang Province